Svitlava Kudelya (born 22 January 1992) is a Paralympian athlete from Ukraine competing mainly in category T20 shot put events. She won the bronze medal in her event at the 2012 Summer Paralympics in London. As well as Paralympic success she has won medals at both World and European level.

Notes

Paralympic athletes of Ukraine
Athletes (track and field) at the 2012 Summer Paralympics
Paralympic bronze medalists for Ukraine
Living people
Ukrainian female shot putters
1992 births
Medalists at the 2012 Summer Paralympics
Paralympic medalists in athletics (track and field)